Rusudan Bolkvadze (born November 6, 1959) is a Georgian actress. She graduated from 55th State School in Tbilisi and went to Shota Rustaveli Theatre and Film State University of Georgia. In 1980 she enrolled at the Studio led by the Georgian director Mikheil Tumanishvili. Currently she is one of the leading actresses in Tumanishvili Film Actors Theatre.

Filmography
My Happy Family (ჩემი ბედნიერი ოჯახი) - 2017
Zone of Conflict (კონფლიქტის ზონა) - 2009
Felicita (ბედნიერება) - 2009
Since Otar Left (რაც ოთარი წავიდა) - 2003
Gmerto, Risi Gulistvis (ღმერთო, რისი გულისათვის) - 2003
Ra Gatsinebs? (რა გაცინებს?) - 1996
Leonardo (ლეონარდო) - 1993
Tskhovreba Don Kikhotisa da Sanchosi (ცხოვრება, დონ კიხოტისა და სანჩოსი) - 1989
Vamekhi Modis (ვამეხი მოდის) - 1988
Robinzoniada, anu chemi ingliseli Papa (რობინზონიადა ანუ ჩემი ინგლისელი პაპა) - 1986
Modi, Vilaparakot (მოდი ვილაპარაკოთ) - 1986
Sizmara (სიზმარა) - 1986
Mejlisi Gakidul Sakhlshi (მეჯლისი გაყიდულ სახლში) - 1985
Aqedana da Shenamde (აქედანა და შენამდე) - 1984
Arachveulebrivi Reisi (არაჩვეულებრივი რეისი) - 1982
Banaki (ბანაკი) - 1982

References

External links

Rusudan Bolkvadze Georgian National Filmography

20th-century actresses from Georgia (country)
1959 births
Living people
21st-century actresses from Georgia (country)
Film actresses from Georgia (country)
Actors from Tbilisi